This is a list of 1991 events that occurred in Romania.

Incumbents
 President: Ion Iliescu 
 Prime Minister: Petre Roman (until October 1), Theodor Stolojan (starting October 16)

Events

February 
 11 February – Mircea Snegur, President of Moldavian SSR, makes first official visit to Romania.

April 
 20 April – The National Bank of Romania launches first post-revolutionary issue of banknotes, dedicated to sculptor Constantin Brâncuși, respectively the banknote of 500 lei.

June 
 24 June – The Romanian Parliament declares null the Molotov–Ribbentrop Pact of 23 August 1939.

July 
 1 July – Romania exits the Warsaw Pact following its dissolution.
 7 July – The Civic Alliance Party is established.

August 
 27 August – Romania is the first country to recognize Moldova's independence from the Soviet Union.

September 
 26 September – September 1991 Mineriad: The Jiu Valley miners return to Victory Square. Here take place negotiations with doors closed, between representatives of the miners and the country's leadership. The ensuing resignation of the second Petre Roman cabinet is announced at 12:30pm from the balcony of Victoria Palace. In the evening, the miners try to break into the headquarters of the Romanian Television. Here take place scenes of violence and vandalism.

October 
 16 October – Installation of the government led by Theodor Stolojan.

November 

 21 November – The Constituent Assembly approves new Constitution of Romania.

December 

 8 December – Is adopted, through a national referendum, the new Constitution of Romania, approved by the Constituent Assembly on 21 November 1991; development, discussion and adoption of the Constitution lasted a year and a half.
 12 December – Supreme Court of Justice, Department of Military, declares not guilty the former members of the Political Executive Committee of the Romanian Communist Party.

Births 

 27 September – Simona Halep, tennis player

Deaths 

 21 January – Ileana of Romania, daughter of King Ferdinand I and Queen Marie (b. 1909)
 6 March – , diabetologist, member of the Romanian Academy and corresponding member of the Academy of Medicine in Paris (b. 1897)
 6 May – Virgil Calotescu, director of documentary and fiction films (b. 1928)
 21 May – Ioan Petru Culianu, historian of religions, writer and essayist (b. 1950)
 3 July – Sigismund Toduță, composer, musicologist, teacher and corresponding member of the Romanian Academy (b. 1908)
 9 August – Cella Delavrancea, pianist, writer and piano teacher (b. 1887)
 21 August – Eugen Jebeleanu, academician, poet, publicist and translator (b. 1911)
 3 September – Elvira Godeanu, actress (b. 1904)
 9 September – Henri H. Stahl, sociologist, anthropologist, ethnographer, historian and member of the Romanian Academy (b. 1901)
 28 October – Ilie G. Murgulescu, chemist, Minister for Higher Education (1953) and member of the Romanian Academy (b. 1902)
 14 November – Constantin Chiriță, writer, novelist, scenarist, essayist and politician (b. 1925)
 3 December – Petre Țuțea, essayist, philosopher, economist and communist politician (b. 1902)
 6 December – Vladimir Colin, the most important Romanian writer of science fiction and fantasy (b. 1921)

References 

Years of the 20th century in Romania
1990s in Romania
 
Romania
Romania